Altınözü (el-Kusayr) is a district in the south-east of Hatay Province of Turkey, on the border between Turkey and Syria. The mayor is Rıfat Sarı (AKP).

History
The region which was known as al-Quṣayr, was part of the Principality of Antioch during the Crusader era. In 1180, patriarch Aimery of Limoges fled to the region, after he had excommunicated Bohemond III in Antioch. The latter besieged the region, but nobleman Rainald II Masoir supported the patriarch, until King Baldwin IV sent a delegation to settle the dispute.

During the land reform of Abdulhamid II, the region was part of the Aleppo vilayet. After World War I, the Ankara Agreement was signed in 1921, in which France was in control for 3 years, until the annexation of Hatay by Turkey, and the region was named as Altınözü.

Geography
Altınözü stands on the fertile Kuseyr plateau, and several crops such as olives (the largest olive growing area is in this part of Turkey), tobacco, grains and other crops are grown here. The district gets its water from the Yarseli reservoir.

Demographics

The district has a population of 52,819, out of which 7,379 live in the town of Altınözü. There is also a refugee camp called the Altinozu Camp that houses 1,350 Syrian Sunnis who have fled the Syrian civil war. The population of the district is mostly Muslim with an Antiochian Greek Orthodox (also known as Rûm Orthodox) Christian community encompassing two churches in the capital of the district and the entirely Christian village of Tokaçlı.

Notes

References

Sources

External links
  local information, follow galeri for photos

Towns in Turkey
Populated places in Hatay Province
Districts of Hatay Province